Triglav was a Slovenian sailplane, designed and produced by LIBIS aircraft during Yugoslavian period.

It was designed by Jaroslav Košer and Stojan Hrovat, then students of the Ljubljana Technical Faculty (Tehniška fakulteta v Ljubljani) of the University of Ljubljana. The first flight was in 1948. The detailed description was published in the Yugoslavian aviation magazine Narodna Krila (People's Wings) in 1949.

The goal of the design team was to create the new Olympic glider for OSTIV (Organisation Scientifique et Technique du Vol à Voile), in competition with the DFS Meise (which won), amongst others.

Specifications

References

External links
 "Koser-Hrovat KB-1 Triglav"

Slovenian sport aircraft
Slovenian sailplanes
LIBIS aircraft